Königsheim is a municipality in the district of Tuttlingen in Baden-Württemberg in Germany.

References

External links
Gemeinde Königsheim

Tuttlingen (district)
Württemberg